The Caucasian Mountain ground squirrel (Spermophilus musicus) is a species of rodent in the family Sciuridae. It is endemic to the North Caucasus.

References

Mammals of Europe
Spermophilus
Taxonomy articles created by Polbot
Endemic fauna of Georgia (country)